Boiry-Becquerelle is a commune in the Pas-de-Calais department in the Hauts-de-France region in northern France.

Geography
A farming village located 7 miles (11 km) south of Arras on the N17 junction with the D35 road.

Population

Sights
 The church of St. Gervais, rebuilt after the destruction of the village during World War I.

See also
Communes of the Pas-de-Calais department

References

Communes of Pas-de-Calais